At least 48 people are killed and 78 wounded in the 27 January 2011 Baghdad bombing. A car bomb targeting Shias was detonated at a funeral tent in the north-western Shula district of Baghdad.

See also

January 2011 Iraq suicide attacks
24 January 2011 Iraq bombings

References

2011 murders in Iraq
21st-century mass murder in Iraq
Mass murder in 2011
Car and truck bombings in Iraq
Terrorist incidents in Iraq in 2011
Islamic terrorist incidents in 2011
2011 in Iraq
Terrorist incidents in Baghdad
2010s in Baghdad
Violence against Shia Muslims in Iraq
January 2011 events in Iraq